Nicolai Møller Dohn (born 18 August 1998) is a Danish footballer, who plays as a midfielder for Skive IK.

Youth career

Dohn was born in Skjød, and starting playing football at HGF Fodbold in a small town called Hammel. He later joined AGF and AC Horsens in 2015.

Club career

AC Horsens
Dohn was the captain of the U19 team and trained occasionally with the first team.

He got his debut for AC Horsens on 8 October 2016. Dohn started on the bench, but replaced Joseph Mensah in the 54th minute in a 3-1 victory against Tarm IF in the Danish Cup.

The midfielder got his official debut for AC Horsens on 8 May 2017. Bech started on the bench, but came on the pitch in the 76th minute, replacing Kjartan Finnbogason in a 2-1 victory against Randers FC in the Danish Superliga. Only 2 days later, Dohn signed a new one-year contract with Horsens. This contract would mean, that he occasionally would be training with the first team, while finishing his school.

Nykøbing FC
Dohn signed for Nykøbing FC on 29 July 2018. On 27 November 2019 it was confirmed, that Dohn would leave the club at the end of the year.

Skive IK
As a free agent, Dohn signed with Skive IK on 1 February 2020.

References

External links
 

1998 births
Living people
Danish men's footballers
Danish Superliga players
Danish 1st Division players
AC Horsens players
Nykøbing FC players
Skive IK players
Association football midfielders
Aarhus Gymnastikforening players
People from Favrskov Municipality
Sportspeople from the Central Denmark Region